The Tewaaraton Award is an annual award for the most outstanding American college lacrosse men's and women's players, since 2001. It is the lacrosse equivalent of football's Heisman Trophy. The award is presented by The Tewaaraton Foundation and the University Club of Washington, D.C.

Lacrosse is the oldest sport played in North America and the award honors the Native American heritage of lacrosse in the name of its award, "Tewaaraton," the Mohawk name for their game and the progenitor of present-day lacrosse. The Tewaaraton Award has received the endorsement of the Mohawk Nation Council of Elders.  Each year, the award recognizes one of the Six Nations of the Haudenosaunee Confederacy: the Mohawk, Cayuga, Oneida, Onondaga, Seneca and Tuscarora tribes.

Trophy

The award winners each receive a trophy of a bronze sculpture depicting a Mohawk native playing lacrosse. It was designed and created by Frederick Kail with the assistance of Thomas Vennum, Jr., a renowned Native American lacrosse historian and author, who consulted with Kail to ensure the trophy's historical authenticity. The 12-inch figure is mounted upon a hexagon-shaped slab of black granite and polished Cocobolo wood. The hexagonal base symbolizes the Six Nations of the Iroquois Confederacy: the Mohawk, Cayuga, Oneida, Onondaga, Seneca, and Tuscarora tribes. With some minor decorative exceptions, the stick is a replica of a pre-1845 Cayuga stick belonging to the grandfather of Alexander T. General of the Six Nations Reserve in Ontario. This stick was an original predecessor of the modern-day lacrosse stick.

Nomination process

Players are nominated for the award by coaches from all three NCAA divisions during the collegiate season. All Watch List nominees are then screened and selected by two Selection Committees. The Selection Committees are composed of collegiate coaches, one committee for the men and one committee for the women. At the conclusion of the season the selection committees meet to rank the top five male and female finalists.  The finalists are then invited to the Awards Banquet, where the Tewaaraton Award winners are announced.
In addition to recognizing the top men’s and women’s collegiate lacrosse players, the Tewaaraton Award also recognizes the High School All-Tewaaraton team for both boys and girls lacrosse. This is a regional team which is composed of the best players from both private and public schools in the Maryland, Washington, D.C., and Virginia area.

USILA versus Tewaaraton
There is debate in the lacrosse community as to whether the Tewaaraton Award is actually an outstanding player award or whether it should be called a postseason award.  The controversy stems from the fact that the award is usually given to a male player who plays well during the season-ending NCAA tournament and from a team which is the winner or runner up in the NCAA Tournament.  The Lt. Raymond Enners Award is the USILA Outstanding Player of the Year Award selected by the NCAA coaches, and the Tewaaraton Award recipient has not been the same as the Raymond Enners Award recipient in 5 out of the first 11 years that the Tewaaraton was awarded. Since then, the two awards have agreed almost exactly; in each season but one from 2012 through 2022, both awards were won by the same individual. The only exception in this span was in 2014, when the Enners Award went to one of the two brothers who shared the Tewaaraton Award.

Tewaaraton Award recipients

Men's awards by university

Women's awards by university

Tewaaraton Legend Award

Since 2011, the Tewaaraton Legend Award has been presented to one recipient each year who played collegiately prior to 2001 when the first Tewaaraton Award was presented, whose performance during their college years would have earned them a Tewaaraton Award had the award existed when they played. All awardees received the Enners Award when they played except for Jim Brown and Jimmy Lewis whose playing days preceded the first Enners Award in 1969.  In 2016, the foundation began presenting both a men's and women's Legend Award.

Legends awards by university

Native American Scholarship Program

Since 2006, The Tewaaraton Foundation has given over $130,000 in scholarships to Native American high school lacrosse players through its Tewaaraton Native American Scholarships program.  The $10,000 scholarships are awarded annually on a highly competitive basis to one Native American female and one Native American male lacrosse player who are enrolled members of a U.S. tribe. All awards are not only based on the student's athletic performance, but also on their merit, academic achievement, and ambition.

See also
Lt. Raymond Enners Outstanding Player Award
Jack Turnbull Outstanding Attackman Award
Lt. j.g. Donald MacLaughlin Jr. Outstanding Midfielder Award
William C. Schmeisser Outstanding Defender Award
Ensign C. Markland Kelly Jr. Outstanding  Goaltender Award
F. Morris Touchstone Outstanding Coach Award

References

External links
 http://www.tewaaraton.com

College lacrosse trophies and awards in the United States
Lacrosse in Syracuse, New York
Awards established in 2001
Premier Lacrosse League partnerships